Hibbertia extrorsa is a species of flowering plant in the family Dilleniaceae and is endemic to a restricted part of the Northern Territory. It is a small, spreading shrub with hairy foliage, linear to elliptic leaves, and yellow flowers arranged in leaf axils with about thirty stamens arranged in groups around the two carpels.

Description
Flowering has been observed in March and April.

Taxonomy
Hibbertia extrorsa was first formally described in 2010 by Hellmut R. Toelken in the Journal of the Adelaide Botanic Gardens from specimens collected in 1990. The specific epithet (extrorsa) means "turned away from the centre" and refers to the curved sepal lobes.

Distribution and habitat
This hibbertia grows in sand on sandstone in woodland in a small area of Arnhem Land in the Northern Territory.

Conservation status
Goodenia extrorsa is classified as "near threatened" under the Territory Parks and Wildlife Conservation Act 1976.

See also
List of Hibbertia species

References

extrorsa
Flora of the Northern Territory
Plants described in 2010
Taxa named by Hellmut R. Toelken